Carl Aaron "Chugger" Davis was an American football, basketball, and baseball coach. He began his coaching career as the head football coach (1928–1929), men's basketball coach (1928–1931), and baseball coach (1929–1932) at Catawba College in Salisbury, North Carolina.

Davis later served as the head football coach (1932–1942, 1946–1962) and head baseball coach (1933–1957) at Cortland Normal School–now State University of New York College at Cortland.

References

Year of birth missing
Year of death missing
American football halfbacks
Missouri State Bears football players
Missouri State Bears basketball players
Catawba Indians football coaches
Catawba Indians men's basketball coaches
Catawba Indians baseball coaches
College men's basketball head coaches in the United States
Cortland Red Dragons football coaches
Cortland Red Dragons baseball coaches